Baron Margadale, of Islay in the County of Argyll, is a title in the Peerage of the United Kingdom. It was created on 1 January 1965 for the Conservative politician John Morrison. , the title is held by his grandson, the third baron, who succeeded his father in 2003. 

The barony of Margadale is the most recent extant hereditary barony, and so Lord Margadale is the most junior of Britain's hereditary peers. The barony is named after the area of Margadale, in Islay.

James Morrison, great-grandfather of the first Baron, was a Hampshire innkeeper's son who became the greatest textile wholesaler in England and a prominent merchant banker. He left circa £4 million in 1857, the second largest non-landed fortune in Britain up to that time after Nathan Mayer Rothschild's £5 million. James's son Charles Morrison continued in the same lines of business, and left £10.9 million in 1909, which was the largest British estate for probate purposes up to that time. He was probably the second richest man in Britain at his death, after the Duke of Westminster. Charles Morrison's nephew Hugh Morrison was the father of the first Baron Margadale. James Morrison, uncle of the first Baron, was a politician. The Honourable Sir Charles Morrison and the Honourable Sir Peter Morrison, younger sons of the first Baron, were both Conservative politicians.

The family seat is Fonthill House, near Fonthill Bishop, Wiltshire.

Barons Margadale (1965)
 John Granville Morrison, 1st Baron Margadale (1906–1996)
 James Ian Morrison, 2nd Baron Margadale (1930–2003)
 Alastair John Morrison, 3rd Baron Margadale (born 1958)

The heir apparent is the present holder's son, the Hon. Declan James Morrison (born 1993)

Line of succession

  Major John Granville Morrison, 1st Baron Margadale (1906–1996)
  James Ian Morrison, 2nd Baron Margadale (1930–2003)
  Alastair John Morrison, 3rd Baron Margadale (born 1958)
 (1) Hon. Declan James Morrison (born 1993)
 (2) Hon. Hugh Morrison (born 1960)
 (3) Geordie Anthony Morrison (born 1989)
 Hon. Sir Charles Andrew Morrison (1932–2005)
 (4) David John Morrison (born 1959)
 (5) Ivo Charles David Morrison (born 1990)

Arms

Notes

References 
Kidd, Charles, Williamson, David (editors). Debrett's Peerage and Baronetage (1990 edition). New York: St Martin's Press, 1990, 
#

Baronies in the Peerage of the United Kingdom
Noble titles created in 1965
Noble titles created for UK MPs
Margadale